"Celestial" is a song by Ed Sheeran, released as a single on 29 September 2022. It was released in collaboration with The Pokémon Company and appears in the end credits of Pokémon Scarlet and Violet, released on 18 November 2022. Sheeran co-wrote the song alongside Steve Mac and Johnny McDaid, and produced it with Mac. The song was released alongside its music video, which includes Sheeran interacting with a variety of Pokémon.

Background
Ed Sheeran is a self-proclaimed Pokémon fan, and had collaborated with the Pokémon Company before. From 22 to 30 November 2021, Pokémon Go featured an in-game performance by Sheeran. In August 2022, Sheeran welcomed participants of the 2022 Pokémon World Championships in a video message.

On 22 September 2022, Sheeran wrote on his Instagram: "I met the people from Pokémon when I was travelling in Japan, and we joked about me writing a song for them", which led to the collaboration. In a separate statement, Sheeran wrote that he liked Pokémon since primary school, and called it "such an honour to add a song into a Pokémon game and shoot a nostalgic video too".

Composition
"Celestial" is a pop song in the key of D major, with a tempo of 123 BPM. It is based around a chord progression of G–Bm–D–A (IV–iv–I–V). This progression can also be seen in the song's video, written in a notebook Sheeran keeps.

Music video
The music video was also released on 29 September 2022, and was directed by Yuichi Kodama. It depicts Sheeran interacting with a variety of sketch-style Pokémon, including "a Snorlax that saves Sheeran from a car accident to a Lapras that takes him across a river". The appearances of the Pokémon were drawn by art director Yu Nagaba. According to an NME article, Nagaba emulated the way Sheeran drew Pokémon when he was younger.

Charts

Weekly charts

Year-end charts

Certifications

Release history

References

2022 singles
2022 songs
Asylum Records singles
Atlantic Records UK singles
Ed Sheeran songs
Pokémon
Song recordings produced by Ed Sheeran
Song recordings produced by Steve Mac
Songs written by Ed Sheeran
Songs written by Johnny McDaid
Songs written by Steve Mac